Ioan Apostol (born 14 January 1959) is a Romanian luger who competed in four Winter Olympics. He was born in Valea Doftanei, Prahova County.

He earned his best finish of fourth in the men's doubles event at Albertville in 1992. Since 2002, Apostol has been the director of development for small nations for the International Luge Federation (FIL).

References
1992 luge men's doubles results
1994 luge men's doubles results
Luge.fr naming of Apostal's contract extension 
Lugesport.com profile

External links
 

1959 births
Living people
Romanian male lugers
Olympic lugers of Romania
Lugers at the 1980 Winter Olympics
Lugers at the 1984 Winter Olympics
Lugers at the 1992 Winter Olympics
Lugers at the 1994 Winter Olympics
People from Prahova County